Harold 'Hal' Pickthall (31 July 1896 – 8 August 1965) was an English first-class cricketer.

Pickthall initially played club cricket in the Lancashire League prior to World War I with Burnley in 1913. He played for Burnley until 1920, after which he began playing for Lowerhouse. He played for Lowerhouse until 1923, and briefly returned to Burnley in 1925 for one match. Pickthall made his debut in minor counties cricket for the Welsh county Monmouthshire in the 1926 Minor Counties Championship against Surrey Second XI at The Oval. He played minor counties cricket for Monmouthshire from 1926–1929, making a total of 24 appearances in the Minor Counties Championship. He first appeared in first-class cricket for the Marylebone Cricket Club against Wales in 1928 at Lord's. He became a mainstay of the MCC side over the next few years, playing annually for them (with the exception of 1933) until 1935, making a total of twelve first-class appearances. Pickthall scored a total of 109 runs across these twelve matches, averaging 10.90, with a highest score of 29 not out. As a bowler, Pickthall took 25 wickets at a bowling average of 30.88, with best innings figures of 4 for 30.

References

External links

1896 births
1965 deaths
Cricketers from Burnley
English cricketers
Monmouthshire cricketers
Marylebone Cricket Club cricketers